Cronica Veche (The Old Chronicle) is a Romanian literary magazine, based in Iași. It appeared in 1966 as Cronica (The Chronicle), and changed its name in 2011.

Notes

1966 establishments in Romania
Literary magazines published in Romania
Magazines established in 1966
Mass media in Iași
Monthly magazines published in Romania
Romanian-language magazines